Christopher Harris may refer to:
 Christopher Harris (died 1623)  MP for West Looe, Cornwall
 Christopher Harris (died 1625), MP for Plymouth, Devon in 1584
Christopher Harris (died 1628), MP for Harwich
 Christopher Columbus Harris (1842–1935), United States Representative from Alabama
 Christopher Harris (cricketer, born 1942), English cricketer
 Christopher Harris, mass murderer from Beason, Illinois

See also
Chris Harris (disambiguation)